Wrong is a 2012 French-American independent surreal comedy film written and directed by Quentin Dupieux. The film stars Jack Plotnick and premiered at the 2012 Sundance Film Festival. It was part of the Toronto International Film Festival's Official Selection. The producers of the film are Gregory Bernard, Charles-Marie Anthonioz, Nicolas Lhermitte and Josef Lieck.

Synopsis
Dolph wakes up early in the morning in his suburban home to find that his dog is missing. He is in denial that he has lost his job and shows up to his office to work every day and pretends to do his work. Dolph's need to live in a world of denial about all the areas in his life that are obviously not working is found throughout his life. A palm tree in his backyard transforms into a pine tree. It's raining inside Dolph's office even though none of his co-workers seem to notice it or care that they're being soaked. To put his life back together, he goes in search of his dog.

Cast

 Jack Plotnick as Dolph Springer 
Éric Judor as Victor 
Alexis Dziena as Emma 
Steve Little as Detective Ronnie 
William Fichtner as Master Chang 
Regan Burns as Mike
Mark Burnham as Cop
Arden Myrin as Gabrielle
Maile Flanagan as Pharmacist 
Gary Valentine as EMT
Barry Alan Levine as Gas Station Attendant

Critical reception
It holds a 65% rating on Rotten Tomatoes based on 43 reviews, with an average rating of 6.1/10. The critical consensus states that "Wrong is strange and meandering, but its absurdist vignettes reveal a unique, wry wit."

Simon Abrams of Slant Magazine did not feel that the film worked:

However, Chase Whale of Twitch Film enjoyed the film:

Soundtrack

The soundtrack to Wrong was produced by Quentin Dupieux under his stage name Mr. Oizo and French electro-rock music producer David Sztanke under the name "Tahiti Boy". Track 7 and 12 were produced by Sztanke's group "Tahiti Boy & The Palmtree Family".

Track listing

References

External links

French independent films
American independent films
2012 comedy films
American comedy films
French comedy films
English-language French films
Films directed by Quentin Dupieux
Films about dogs
Films shot in Los Angeles
2012 independent films
2010s English-language films
2010s American films
2010s French films
Surreal comedy films